The 22nd  ceremony of the Forqué Awards was held on 14 January 2017 at the Teatro de la Maestranza in Seville. The gala was hosted by Carlos Latre.

History 
The nominations were disclosed in December 2016.

It thus became the first ceremony of the Feroz Awards held outside Madrid. It was hosted by Carlos Latre.

Antonio P. Pérez was gifted the EGEDA Gold Medal recognizing a career in the film industry.

Winners and nominees
The winners and nominees are listed as follows:

References

External links 
 Gala of the 22nd Forqué Awards on RTVE Play

Forqué Awards
2017 film awards
January 2017 events in Spain
Events in Seville
2017 in Andalusia